Piedra Vista High School (PVHS) is a public high school in Farmington, New Mexico, founded in 1998. It is part of the Farmington Municipal School District.

PVHS is one of two high schools in Farmington and is located on the city's northeast side. The older high school is Farmington High School. PVHS' mascot is the Black Panther and its colors are navy blue, silver, and black. The two schools share Hutchison Stadium, located at Farmington High School, for home football games. Piedra Vista varsity baseball games are played at Ricketts Park in Farmington.

Athletics and arts

Piedra Vista High School is part of NMAA AAAA District 1. It has 16 athletic teams, in accordance with Title IX.

References

Public high schools in New Mexico
Schools in San Juan County, New Mexico
1998 establishments in New Mexico
Educational institutions established in 1998